Gyeongae of Silla (died 927) (r. 924–927) was the 55th ruler of the Korean kingdom of Silla.

Biography

He was the son of King Sindeok by Queen Uiseong, and was the younger brother of King Gyeongmyeong, who preceded him to the throne.

Gyeongae ascended the Silla throne in the midst of the Later Three Kingdoms period, and thus ruled over only a small portion of what had once been Unified Silla.  In the end, even that last small portion was overwhelmed by Hubaekje forces under Gyeon Hwon.

When Gyeon Hwon's army sacked Gyeongju in 927, they found Gyeongae partying at the Poseokjeong pavilion.  The king killed himself rather than surrender.  Gyeon Hwon set Gyeongsun on the throne in his stead, and returned to the west.

King Gyeongae was buried on Namsan.  His tomb is called "Haemongnyeong."

Family
Parents
Father: King Sindeok of Silla (? – 917) (신라 신덕왕)
Grandfather: Park Ye–gyeom (박예겸) or Park Moon-won
Grandmother: Madame Jeonghwa (정화부인)
Mother: Queen Uiseong of the Gyeongju Kim clan (의성왕후 김씨)
Maternal Grandfather: Heongang of Silla
Maternal Grandmother: Lady Uimyeong (의명부인)
Consorts and their Respective Issue:
Unnamed wife
Grand Prince Park Gyo-sun of Geumseong(박교순 금성대군)–was general of Silla and the founder of Ulsan Park clan
Grand Prince Park Sun-hyeon of Gyerim (박순현 계림대군)

See also
List of Korean monarchs
List of Silla people
Later Three Kingdoms of Korea

References

Silla rulers
Silla Buddhists
Korean Buddhist monarchs
927 deaths
10th-century rulers in Asia
Year of birth unknown